Bill Curtis (27 December 1902 – 12 June 1977) was an Australian rules footballer who played with Fitzroy in the Victorian Football League (VFL).

Notes

External links 
		

1902 births
1977 deaths
Australian rules footballers from Victoria (Australia)
Fitzroy Football Club players